Fushigi is Japanese for "mystery" or "secret" and may also refer to:

 Fushigi (Helix), episode of the US TV series
 Fushigi, an online retailer of 'magic gravity' balls for use in contact juggling
, Japanese voice actress
 Fushigi Yûgi, 1992-6 Japanese manga series
Toei Fushigi Comedy Series

Music
 Fushigi (album), 1986 Japanese pop music album by Akina Nakamori
"Fushigi", song by Japanese rock band Spitz SazanamiCD 2007
"Fushigi", single by RC Succession 1984

See also